Three Coins in the Fountain may refer to:

Three Coins in the Fountain (1954 film)
"Three Coins in the Fountain" (song), sung in the above film

See also
Coins in the Fountain, a 1990 remake of the 1954 film
Coins in the Fountain (novel), the inspiration for the film
Trevi Fountain, part of the inspiration for the novel